Glenn Potter (born c. 1938) is a former college basketball coach, who succeeded Stan Watts at Brigham Young University in 1972.   Potter coached three seasons for the Cougars and posted a 42–36 (.538) record before resigning in 1975.  He was replaced by Frank Arnold

References

1930s births
Living people
American men's basketball coaches
BYU Cougars men's basketball coaches
Nebraska Cornhuskers men's basketball coaches